The  Brown-Evans House, located at 405 First Ave., W., in Mobridge, South Dakota, was built in 1916.  It was listed on the National Register of Historic Places in 1990.

It is a one-story wood frame clapboarded bungalow on a concrete foundation.  It was deemed notable "because it is a nearly unaltered local example of vernacular bungalow styling. Built for developer A. H. Brown in 1916 presumably for rental purposes, it is one [of] the few surviving bungaloid dwellings in the community."

References

Houses on the National Register of Historic Places in South Dakota
Houses completed in 1916
Walworth County, South Dakota